Reuben Ruby Richman (22 September 1934 – 2 November 2021) was a Canadian basketball player. He competed in the men's tournament at the 1964 Summer Olympics.

References

External links
 
 R. Ruby Richman at Canada Basketball Hall of Fame

1934 births
2021 deaths
Canadian men's basketball players
Olympic basketball players of Canada
Basketball players at the 1964 Summer Olympics
People from Willowdale, Toronto
Sportspeople from North York
Basketball players from Toronto